Olive Risley Seward is a lead on burlap statue by American sculptor John Cavanaugh, located at North Carolina Avenue and Sixth Street, Southeast, Washington, D.C., in the Capitol Hill neighborhood.

Completed in 1971, it is a representation of Olive Risley Seward (1841–1908), the foster daughter of William H. Seward.

See also
 List of public art in Washington, D.C., Ward 6

References

External links
 http://dcmemorials.com/index_indiv0000212.htm
 http://www.theslot.com/hill/imagepages/image20.htm

1971 sculptures
Lead sculptures
Monuments and memorials in Washington, D.C.
Outdoor sculptures in Washington, D.C.
Sculptures of women in Washington, D.C.
Statues in Washington, D.C.